The Mercury Theatre (1937–1946) was an independent repertory theatre company founded in New York City by Orson Welles and producer John Houseman.

Mercury Theatre may also refer to:

England
 Mercury Theatre, Notting Hill Gate, London, 1933–1987
 Mercury Theatre, Colchester, England, opened 1972

Oceania
 Mercury Theatre, Auckland New Zealand theatre, founded 1910
 Mercury Theatre (Australia), renamed by actor Peter Finch

Entertainment
 The Mercury Theatre on the Air, (originally titled First Person Singular), a 1938 radio drama anthology series created by Orson Welles

Lists of theatres